Mikhail Petrovich Fedoruk (born February 18, 1956) — is a rector of Novosibirsk State University, Doctor of Physics and Mathematics.

Biography 
Mikhail P. Fedoruk born February 18, 1956, in the Kochenyovsky District of Novosibirsk District, Russia.

In 1982 he graduated from the Faculty of Physics, Novosibirsk State University and began his scientific career with postgraduate study in the Institute of Theoretical and Applied Mechanics SB RAS. 
His teaching activities are connected with Novosibirsk State University. Since 1995 he worked as a lecturer at the Faculty of Mathematics and Mechanics, in 2003 became the first deputy dean of the faculty.

June 22, 2012 he was elected rector of NSU.

In 2022, he signed the Address of the Russian Union of Rectors, which called to support Putin in his invasion of Ukraine.

He is married and has a son.

References

1956 births
Living people
Soviet physicists
20th-century Russian physicists
21st-century Russian physicists